Inglourious Basterds is a 2009 World War II film written and directed by Quentin Tarantino. It premiered on May 20, 2009 at the 62nd Cannes Film Festival, before being widely released in theaters in the United States and Europe in August 2009 by The Weinstein Company and Universal Studios. The film grossed over $38 million in its opening weekend, making it the box office number one. Inglourious Basterds opened internationally at number one in 22 markets on 2,650 screens making $27.49 million. In total, the film has grossed over $320 million worldwide, making it Tarantino's third highest-grossing film to date, behind Django Unchained (2012) and Once Upon a Time in Hollywood (2019).

Inglourious Basterds has earned various awards and nominations, with nominations in categories ranging from recognition of the screenplay to its direction and editing to the cast's acting performance, particularly Christoph Waltz's portrayal of the film's antagonist, Col. Hans Landa. The film was submitted for consideration for the Palme d'Or at the 62nd annual Cannes Film Festival, but lost to The White Ribbon. Waltz was later given the Best Actor Award. Inglourious Basterds received four nominations at the 67th Golden Globe Awards ceremony and came away with the award for Best Actor In A Supporting Role In A Motion Picture.

Inglourious Basterds received eight Academy Awards nominations; the ceremony saw Waltz win for Best Supporting Actor. The film was nominated for six awards at the 63rd British Academy Film Awards, winning the Best Supporting Actor award. The film won two awards at the 16th Screen Actors Guild Awards for Outstanding Performance by a Male Actor in a Supporting Role and Outstanding Performance by a Cast in a Motion Picture. The film later went on to win four more of its nominations for Best Cast from the 15th Critics' Choice Awards, and 14th San Diego Film Critics Society Awards.

Waltz also received recognition for his performance at the 2009 Boston Society of Film Critics Awards, 35th LA Film Critics Association Awards and 75th NY Film Critics Circle Awards, winning Best Supporting Actor from all three of the organizations. Waltz's performance in the film was named one of Time magazines 'Great Performances' in film 2009.

Awards and nominations

References

External links
 

Lists of accolades by film
Quentin Tarantino